Michael Burawoy (born 15 June 1947) is a sociologist working within Marxist social theory, best known as the leading proponent of public sociology and the author of Manufacturing Consent: Changes in the Labor Process Under Monopoly Capitalism—a study on the sociology of industry that has been translated into a number of languages.

Burawoy is a Professor of Sociology at the University of California, Berkeley.  He was president of the American Sociological Association in 2004. In 2006–2010, he was one of the vice-presidents for the Committee of National Associations of the International Sociological Association (ISA). In the XVII ISA World Congress of Sociology he was elected the 17th President of the International Sociological Association (ISA) for the period 2010–2014.

Biography
Burawoy was born on 15 June 1947.  Graduating as a mathematics student from the University of Cambridge in 1968, Burawoy went on to pursue postgraduate study in the newly independent African nation of Zambia, while simultaneously working as a researcher for Anglo American PLC. Completing a master's degree at the University of Zambia in 1972, Burawoy enrolled as a doctoral student at the University of Chicago, finishing a sociology dissertation with an ethnography of Chicago industrial workers, later to become Manufacturing Consent: Changes in the Labor Process Under Monopoly Capitalism.

Burawoy joined the Department of Sociology, University of California, Berkeley in 1976 as an assistant professor.
He served as Chair of the Department of Sociology for 1996-98, and 2000-02.

Aside from Burawoy's sociological study of the industrial workplace in Zambia, Burawoy has studied industrial workplaces in Chicago, Hungary, and post-Soviet Russia.  His method of choice is usually participant observation, more specifically ethnography. He has further expanded the extended case method. For his book The Radiant Past: Ideology and Reality in Hungary's Road to Capitalism (1992) he  worked as a furnace operator in a Hungarian steel plant. Based on his studies of the workplace he has looked into the nature of postcolonialism, the organization of state socialism, and the problems in the transition from socialism.

In more recent times, Burawoy has moved away from observing factories to looking at his own place of work—the university—to consider the way sociology is taught to students and how it is put into the public domain. His work on public sociology is most prominently shown in his presidential address to the American Sociological Association in 2004, where he divides sociology into four separate (yet overlapping) categories: public sociology, policy sociology (which has an extra-academic audience), professional sociology (which addresses an academic audience familiar with theoretical and methodological frameworks common to the discipline of sociology), and lastly critical sociology which, like public sociology, produces reflexive knowledge but which is only available to an academic audience, like professional sociology.

Selected works

Books

Author (or co-author)
 The Colour of Class on the Copper Mines: From African Advancement to Zambianization. Manchester: Manchester University Press, 1972
 Manufacturing Consent: Changes in the Labor Process Under Monopoly Capitalism. Chicago: University of Chicago Press, 1979
 The Politics of Production: Factory Regimes Under Capitalism and Socialism. London: Verso, 1985
 The Radiant Past: Ideology and Reality in Hungary's Road to Capitalism. Chicago: University of Chicago Press, 1992 (With János Lukács)
 The Extended Case Method: Four Countries, Four Decades, Four Great Transformations, and One Theoretical Tradition (University of California Press), 2009

Collaborative and edited books
 Marxist Inquiries: Studies of Labor, Class and States. Chicago: University of Chicago Press. Supplement to the American Journal of Sociology. Edited with Theda Skocpol, 1983
 Ethnography Unbound: Power and Resistance in the Modern Metropolis. Berkeley: University of California Press, 1991 (With ten coauthors)
 Uncertain Transition: Ethnographies of Change in the PostSocialist World. Lanham, MD: Rowman and Littlefield. Edited with Katherine Verdery, 1998
 От Деревянного Парижа к Панельной Орбите: Модель жилищных классов Сыктывкара. (From Timbered Paris to Concrete Orbita: The Structure of Housing Classes in Syktyvkar). Syktyvkar: Institute of Regional Social Research of Komi, 1999 (With Pavel Krotov and Tatyana Lytkina)
 Global Ethnography: Forces, Connections and Imaginations in a Postmodern World. Berkeley: University of California Press, 2000 (With nine coauthors)

Articles
 "Dwelling in Capitalism, Traveling Through Socialism.]" pp. 21–44 in Baldoz et al. (editors), The Critical Study of Work (Philadelphia: Temple University Press.)
  Pdf.
 "What Happened to the Working Class?" pp. 69–76 in Kevin Leicht (ed.), The Future of the Market transition (New York: JAI Press), 2002
 "Sociological Marxism." pp. 459–86 in Jonathan Turner (ed.), The Handbook of Sociological Theory, 2002 (Plenum Books) (With Erik Wright)
  Pdf.
  Pdf.
  Pdf.
 "The Critical Turn to Public Sociology," pp. 309–322 in Rhonda Levine (ed.) Enriching the Sociological Imagination: How Radical Sociology Changed the Discipline, New York, 2004
  English pdf.
 "Antinomian Marxist," pp. 48–71 in Alan Sica and Stephen Turner (eds.), The Disobedient Generation: Social Theorists in the Sixties (Chicago: University of Chicago Press), 2005
  Pdf.
 "Provincializing the Social Sciences." pp. 508–525 in George Steinmetz (editor), The Politics of Method in the Human Sciences: Positivism and its Epistemological Others (Durhman, NC: Duke University Press), 2005
  Pdf.
  Burawoy's website. Pdf.
 "Private Troubles and Public Issues," pp. 125–133 in Andrew Barlow (editor), Collaborations for Social Justice (Lanham, MD: Rowman and Littlefield), 2007
  Pdf.

References

External links
 

1947 births
Alumni of the University of Cambridge
American ethnographers
American Marxists
American sociologists
Living people
Marxist writers
Presidents of the American Sociological Association
University of California, Berkeley College of Letters and Science faculty
University of Chicago alumni
University of Zambia alumni
World system scholars
Presidents of the International Sociological Association